The Caesar Rodney Institute (CRI) is a nonprofit Delaware-based think tank that researches economic issues such as jobs, education, energy, and healthcare.

References

Economic advocacy groups in the United States